Tamás Mendelényi (2 May 1936 – 6 September 1999) was a Hungarian fencer. He won a gold medal in the team sabre event at the 1960 Summer Olympics.

References

External links
 

1936 births
1999 deaths
Hungarian male sabre fencers
Olympic fencers of Hungary
Fencers at the 1960 Summer Olympics
Olympic gold medalists for Hungary
Fencers from Budapest
Olympic medalists in fencing
Medalists at the 1960 Summer Olympics